Thornapple Township is a civil township of Barry County in the U.S. state of Michigan. The population was 7,884 at the 2010 census. It is the most populous township in Barry County.

Geography
Thornapple Township is located in the northwest corner of Barry County. It includes the village of Middleville, population 3,319. The Thornapple River, a tributary of the Grand River, flows from south to north through the middle of the township.

Demographics
As of the census of 2000, there were 6,685 people, 2,292 households, and 1,835 families residing in the township. The racial makeup of the township was 96.89% White, 0.15% African American, 0.42% Native American, 0.46% Asian, 0.06% Pacific Islander, 0.63% from other races, and 1.39% from two or more races. Hispanic or Latino of any race were 1.41% of the population.

There were 2,292 households, out of which 43.2% had children under the age of 18 living with them, 68.1% were married couples living together, 7.9% had a female householder with no husband present, and 19.9% were non-families. 16.6% of all households were made up of individuals, and 6.5% had someone living alone who was 65 years of age or older.  The average household size was 2.91 and the average family size was 3.29.

In the township the population was spread out, with 31.7% under the age of 18, 8.3% from 18 to 24, 31.1% from 25 to 44, 21.2% from 45 to 64, and 7.6% who were 65 years of age or older.  The median age was 33 years. For every 100 females, there were 98.7 males.  For every 100 females age 18 and over, there were 97.6 males.

The median income for a household in the township was $53,333, and the median income for a family was $58,171. Males had a median income of $44,212 versus $26,861 for females. The per capita income for the township was $20,782.  About 3.7% of families and 4.9% of the population were below the poverty line, including 4.8% of those under age 18 and 9.8% of those age 65 or over.

References

External links
Thornapple Township official website

Townships in Barry County, Michigan
Grand Rapids metropolitan area
Townships in Michigan